Michał Przysiężny was the defending champion, but decided to participate in 2014 U.S. National Indoor Tennis Championships instead.

Bolelli won the title, defeating Jan-Lennard Struff in the final, 7–6(8–6), 6–4.

Seeds

Draw

Finals

Top half

Bottom half

References
 Main Draw
 Qualifying Draw

Trofeo Faip-Perrel - Singles
2014 Singles